Peter J. Lambert is a retired United States Air Force major general who last served as the Assistant Deputy Chief of Staff, Intelligence, Surveillance and Reconnaissance of the U.S. Air Force. Previously, he was the Deputy Director for Intelligence, Surveillance and Reconnaissance Operations of the Joint Staff.

References

External links

Year of birth missing (living people)
Living people
Place of birth missing (living people)
United States Air Force generals